Festuca hallii, the Piper plains rough fescue, is a species of grass which can be found in Central Canada and in such US states as New Mexico, North Dakota, Montana, Washington, and Wyoming.

Description 
Festuca hallii is a perennial bunchgrass with short rhizomes. It has stiff, rough leaf blades which grow to 10-35cm on average, and flowering culms which grow to 20-65cm on average.

References

hallii
Flora of North America